Anna Gabrielle "Gabby" Traxler (born 10 May 1998) is a Canadian professional racing cyclist, who currently rides for UCI Women's Continental Team .

Traxler has also represented the Canadian national team in professional races, and in 2015, competed in the women's junior road race at the 2015 UCI Road World Championships.

References

External links

1998 births
Living people
Canadian female cyclists
Place of birth missing (living people)